Idappadi block is a revenue block in the Salem district of Tamil Nadu, India. It has a total of 10 panchayat villages.  They are:

 Adaiyur
 Avaniperur East
 Chettimankurichi
 Chithoor
 Dhadhapuram
 Iruppali
 Nedungulam
 Pakkanadu
 Vellarivelli
 Vembaneri

References 

Revenue blocks of Salem district